Grupo Silvio Santos (Silvio Santos Group in English), is a Brazilian holding led by the Brazilian billionaire media-man Silvio Santos.

The principal member of the holding is SBT, the second biggest network television in Brazil. The group also controls the Tele Sena, the Teatro Imprensa, Jequiti, Sisan Empreendimentos  and many other investments such as hotels and shopping malls.

The group may also be recognized by its initials,  GSS. In 2008 it was considered the 63rd largest company in Brazil.

The branch of communication represented by SBT and TV Alphaville is the third largest media conglomerate in the country behind only of the Grupo Globo owner of TV Globo and Grupo Abril.

Holdings

 SBT - Network TV, the 2nd largest network TV of Brazil.
 SBT HD
 SBT Jaú
 SBT Rio de Janeiro
 SBT São José dos Campos
 SBT Nova Friburgo
 SBT São Paulo
 SBT Belém
 SBT Porto Alegre
 SBT Ribeirão Preto
 SBT Brasília
 101 SBT affiliates
 SBT International Corporation
 SBT Music
 SBT Filmes
 CDT da Anhanguera
 Auto Moto Shopping Vimave
 Silvio Santos Participações
 Liderança Capitalização
 Perícia Administradora e Corretora de Seguros
 Promolíder Promotora de vendas
 SSF Fomento Comercial
 Sisan Empreendimentos Imobiliários
 TV Alphaville
 Canal TV Alphaville
 Centro Cultural do Grupo Silvio Santos
 Baú em Casa
 GSS Centro de Serviços Compartilhados
 Hotel Jequitimar
 SS Comércio de Cosméticos e Produção de Higiene Pessoal
 Lojas do Baú Crediário
 Teleton Brasil
 Teatro Imprensa
 Baú da Felicidade
 Tele Sena

Companies that belonged to the GSS

 TV Corcovado, CNT today.
 Rádio Record São Paulo, sold to Edir Macedo.
 Rede Record, sold to Edir Macedo. At the time of sale Rede Record was the 4th largest network TV in the country. After a heavy investment in 2008 it became the 3rd network television in audience.
 Banco Panamericano sold to investment bank BTG Pactual
 Hydrogen, sold to Hypermarcas
 Lojas do Baú da Felicidade, was the groups retail company, but was sold to Magazine Luíza
 Braspag, sold to Cielo

 
Mass media companies of Brazil
Mass media companies based in São Paulo
Conglomerate companies of Brazil
Mass media companies established in 1958
1958 establishments in Brazil
Privately held companies of Brazil